Psychedelicatessen may refer to:

 Psychedelicatessen (Threshold album), 1994
 Psychedelicatessen (Lubricated Goat album), 1990
 Psychedelicatessen, (Moodswings album), 1997